On the Jewish calendar, the seventh day of the month of Adar, also known as Zayin Adar (Hebrew: ז׳ אַדָּר) is traditionally given as the date of the death of Moses. It is also believed to be the date of his birth, 120 years earlier. It is believed that Moses was born in Adar I and died in Adar II.

The Biblical sources suggesting these dates are as follows: Joshua crossed the Jordan river on the 10th of Nisan. Earlier, God had commanded Joshua to perform the crossing "in three days' time" (Joshua 1:1-12), thus this command was given on 7 Nisan. The command is specified as coming "after the death of Moses" (Joshua 1:1). Moses had been mourned for 30 days after his death (Deuteronomy 34:6). Assuming that the Divine command immediately followed the end of the mourning period, Moses must have died 30 days before 7 Nisan, i.e. 7 Adar.

Traditional practices
The pious Jew will fast on the seventh of Adar. A special tikkun (prayer) is added prior to services. Jewish burial societies often meet on the seventh of Adar.

Practices in Israel

From this idea, the Israel Defense Forces have designated this day in remembrance of those soldiers who have fallen in war, though their bodies have not been found or identified. On Mount Herzl, there is a wall with the names of 588 fallen soldiers who died in Israel with unknown grave sites.

References

Jewish fast days
Adar observances